Friedrich Karl Topp (29 September 1895, Voerde – 24 April 1981) was a naval officer in Germany during both World Wars.

Topp was born in Voerde in the Prussian Rhine Province. His father was a minister. He joined the Imperial German Navy in 1914 and took part in World War I in the U Boat service. At the end of the war he was a first officer of  under the command of Martin Niemöller. After the war he was transferred to the Reichsmarine. Later, he was the chairman of the commission for shipbuilding reporting to the Reichsminister für Rüstung und Kriegsproduktion Albert Speer (Minister of Armament and War Production); his last rank was Vizeadmiral (Viceadmiral). After the war the British Army engaged him some months for winding up the German shipyards. In 1946 he was released from being a prisoner-of-war. After this, for nearly ten years he worked as a commercial representative, living in Jever, Lower Saxony, where he died after retirement.

Bibliography
 Martin Niemöller: Vom U-Boot zur Kanzel. Edition 3, Warneck, Berlin 1937
 Ludovic Kennedy. Menace: The Life and Death of the Tirpitz. London: Sidgwick & Jackson, 1979. , 

1895 births
1981 deaths
People from Wesel (district)
People from the Rhine Province
Imperial German Navy personnel of World War I
Reichsmarine personnel
Vice admirals of the Kriegsmarine
Recipients of the clasp to the Iron Cross, 1st class
German prisoners of war in World War II held by the United Kingdom